The 1962 FIFA World Cup was the seventh edition of the FIFA World Cup, the quadrennial international football championship for senior men's national teams. It was held from 30 May to 17 June 1962 in Chile. The qualification rounds took place between August 1960 and December 1961, with 56 teams entering from six confederations, and fourteen qualifying for the finals tournament alongside Chile, the hosts, and Brazil, the defending champions.

Brazil successfully defended their World Cup title, defeating Czechoslovakia 3–1 in the final in the Chilean capital of Santiago. They became the second team, after Italy in 1934 and 1938, to win the World Cup twice consecutively; no team has since achieved the feat. Host nation Chile finished third, defeating Yugoslavia 1–0 in the third-place play-off.

The tournament was marred by violence between players on the pitch and a toxic atmosphere; it included the first-round match between Chile and Italy (2–0), which became known as the Battle of Santiago, one of a number of violent matches played throughout the tournament. It was the first World Cup that used goal average as a means of separating teams with the same number of points. It was also the first World Cup in which the average number of goals per match was less than three (2.78); this has been repeated at every World Cup since, despite expansion of the tournament.

Host selection

After Europe hosted two consecutive World Cups, the American federations claimed the 1962 edition must be held in South America or they would stage a complete boycott of the tournament, similar to 1938. Argentina, after previously failed candidacies, was the favorite. Magallanes' chairman, Ernesto Alvear, attended a FIFA Congress held in Helsinki while the Finnish city was hosting the 1952 Summer Olympics. He considered that Chile was able to organise the World Cup. Several sources also say that FIFA did not want Argentina to run alone, requesting the participation of Chile as almost symbolic. Chile registered its candidacy in 1954 alongside Argentina and West Germany, the latter withdrawing at the request of FIFA.

Chile's football federation committee, led by Carlos Dittborn and Juan Pinto Durán, toured many countries convincing various football associations about the country's ability to organise the tournament in comparison to Argentina's superior sports infrastructure and prestige. The FIFA Congress met in Lisbon, Portugal on 10 June 1956. That day, Raul Colombo, representing Argentina's candidacy, ended his speech with the phrase "We can start the World Cup tomorrow. We have it all." The next day, Dittborn presented four arguments that supported Chile's candidacy: Chile's continued participations at FIFA-organised conferences and tournaments, sports climate, tolerance of race and creed and political and institutional stability of the country. In addition, Dittborn invoked Article 2 of the FIFA statutes that addressed the tournament's role in promoting the sport in countries deemed "underdeveloped". In a counter-point to Colombo's claim that "We have it all" Dittborn coined the phrase "Because we have nothing, we want to do it all" around the fifteenth minute of his speech. Chile won 32 votes to Argentina's 10. Fourteen members abstained from voting.

Qualification

57 teams entered the 1962 World Cup (due to rejected entries and withdrawals, 52 teams eventually participated in the qualifying stages). Chile as host nation and Brazil as reigning World Cup champions were granted automatic qualification, with the remaining 14 finals places divided among the continental confederations.

Eight places were contested by UEFA teams (Europe) and three by CONMEBOL teams (South America). CAF teams (Africa), AFC teams (Asia), NAFC teams (North America), and CCCF teams (Central America and Caribbean) contested three play-offs slots. The three winners would then face a European or South American team for entry into the World Cup. The 1962 tournament was the last one for which only nations from Europe or the Americas qualified.

Two teams qualified for the first time ever: Colombia and Bulgaria. Colombia would not qualify for another World Cup until 1990.

Among the teams who failed to qualify were the 1958 runners up Sweden and third-place finishers France. Austria withdrew during the qualification tournament due to financial problems.

Italy, Switzerland and Uruguay all qualified for the first time since 1954, and Spain for the first time since 1950. Scotland failed to qualify for the first time since rejoining FIFA in 1946 (though they had ultimately also declined to participate in the 1950 edition).

List of qualified teams

The following 16 teams qualified for the final tournament.

AFC (0)
 None qualified
CAF (0)
 None qualified

CONCACAF (1)
 
CONMEBOL (5)
 
 
  (hosts)
 
 

UEFA (10)

Venues
Originally, eight stadiums were selected to host the World Cup matches in eight cities: Santiago, Viña del Mar, Rancagua, Arica, Talca, Concepción, Talcahuano and Valdivia.

The Valdivia earthquake, the most powerful earthquake ever recorded, occurred on 22 May 1960. With over 50,000 casualties and more than 2 million people affected, the earthquake forced the organising committee to completely modify the World Cup's calendar. Talca, Concepción, Talcahuano and Valdivia were severely damaged and discarded as venues. Antofagasta and Valparaíso declined to host any matches as their venues were not financially self-sustainable. Viña del Mar and Arica managed to rebuild their stadiums while Braden Copper Company, then an American company that controlled the El Teniente copper mine, allowed the use of its stadium in Rancagua. Due to these setbacks, this is the World Cup edition with the smallest number of venues spread across the country (while the 1930 FIFA World Cup was held in three venues, all of them were located in a single city). The most used stadium was the Estadio Nacional in Santiago, with 10 matches; the Estadio Sausalito in Viña del Mar hosted 8 matches, and the stadiums in Rancagua and far-away Arica (the only location that was not close to the other cities) both hosted 7 matches. Being that Estadio Nacional was the only large venue of the tournament (all others had less than 20,000 seats), it also saw the largest attendance average, by far, with Estadio Sausalito's attendance only being boosted with the Brazil matches it hosted (the semifinal between Czechoslovakia and Yugoslavia was the only one in the stadium with less than 10,000 spectators).

Being largely concerned with the build-up of the country after the 1960 earthquake, government support for the tournament was minimal.

Team bases

Squads

Squads for the 1962 World Cup consisted of 22 players, as for the previous tournament in 1958.

After Attilio Demaría and Luis Monti, who both represented Argentina in 1930 and Italy in 1934, Ferenc Puskás (Hungary in 1954, then Spain), José Santamaría (Uruguay in 1954, then Spain) and José Altafini (Brazil in 1958, then Italy) became the third, fourth and fifth players to play for two national teams in the World Cup. In light of this, FIFA created stipulations describing that once a player represents a nation during a World Cup or its qualifying rounds the player cannot switch to another national team. Robert Prosinečki and Robert Jarni would later become the sixth and seventh such players, playing for Yugoslavia in 1990, then for Croatia in 1998; Davor Šuker was also selected in both squads, but did not play in 1990. This was accepted by FIFA because Croatia was a newly independent former republic of Yugoslavia.

Match officials
Eighteen match officials from 17 countries were assigned to the tournament to serve as referees and assistant referees.

Europe
 Erich Steiner
 Arthur Blavier
 Ken Aston
 Juan Gardeazábal
 Pierre Schwinte
 Albert Dusch
 Andor Dorogi
 Cesare Jonni
 Leo Horn

 Robert Holley Davidson
 Gottfried Dienst
 Karol Galba
 Nikolay Latyshev
 Branko Tesanić

South America
 João Etzel Filho
 Sergio Bustamante
 Carlos Robles
 Arturo Yamasaki

Seeding

Format
The format of the competition was similar to that of the 1958 competition: 16 teams qualified, divided into four groups of four. Four teams were seeded in the draw taking place in Santiago, on 18 January 1962: Brazil, England, Italy and Uruguay. The top two teams in each group advanced to the quarter-finals.

Two points were awarded for a win and one for a draw. In a change from the 1958 format, goal average was used to separate any teams equal on points. (In 1958, goal average was available, but was only between teams level on points in first place, or if a playoff between teams equal in second place failed to yield a result after extra time). Argentina became the first team in World Cup history to be eliminated on goal average when England advanced from Group 4 in second place.

In the knockout games, if the teams were level after ninety minutes, thirty minutes of extra time were played. For any match other than the final, if the teams were still even after extra time then lots would be drawn to determine the winner. The final would have been replayed if still tied after extra time; but if still tied after the replay, the champion would have been decided by drawing lots. In the event, no replays or drawing of lots were necessary.

Summary
In May 1960, as the preparations were well under way, Chile suffered the largest earthquake ever recorded (9.5 magnitude), which caused enormous damage to the national infrastructure. In the face of this, Carlos Dittborn, the president of the Organization Committee, coined the phrase "Porque nada tenemos, lo haremos todo" (Because we have nothing, we will do everything). Stadia and other infrastructure were rebuilt at record speed and the tournament occurred on schedule with no major organisational flaw. Dittborn did not live to see the success of his efforts, as he died one month before the start of the tournament. The World Cup venue at Arica was named Estadio Carlos Dittborn in his honour and bears his name to this day. Even with these few and low-capacity stadiums Chile was able to meet the demand for seats as international travel to Chile, far-away for Europe, was minimal at the time.

President Jorge Alessandri gave an uninspiring inaugural speech before the first match, which was played between Chile and Switzerland. Alessandri left however before the end of the match. While Chilean society was living in a "footballized" atmosphere, Alessandri was criticized for his cold attitude towards the tournament, which forced his ministers to come out and claim he was as "footballized" as everybody else, but was too busy to devote too much attention to the competition.

The competition was marred by constant violence on the pitch. This poisonous atmosphere culminated in the first-round match between host Chile and Italy (2–0), known as the Battle of Santiago. Two Italian journalists had written unflattering articles about the host country and its capital city; describing Santiago as a "proudly backwards and poverty-stricken dump full of prostitution and crime". Although only two players (both of them Italian) were sent off by the English referee Ken Aston, the match saw repeated attempts from players on both sides to harm opponents, and the Italian team needed police protection to leave the field in safety. Articles in the Italian papers La Nazione and Corriere della Sera were saying that allowing Chile to host the World Cup was "pure madness"; this was used and magnified by local newspapers to inflame the Chilean population. The British newspaper the Daily Express wrote "The tournament shows every sign of developing into a violent bloodbath. Reports read like battlefront despatches; the Italy vs West Germany match was described as 'wrestling and warfare'".

As the competition began, a shift in strategy was imminent. Defensive strategies began to take hold as the average goals per match dropped to 2.78, under 3 for the first time in competition history (the average has never been above 3 since).

Pelé was injured in the second group match against Czechoslovakia. The Soviet Union goalkeeper Lev Yashin, arguably the best goalkeeper in the world at the time, was in poor form and his team went out to Chile (1–2) in the quarter-finals. Bright spots included the emergence of the young Brazilians Amarildo (standing in for Pelé) and Garrincha, the heroics of Czechoslovakia goalkeeper Viliam Schrojf against Hungary and Yugoslavia, and the performance of the host nation Chile, who took third place with a squad of relatively unknown players.. This has been the best performance of a South American team in a World Cup so far without taking into account the historical ones (Brazil, Argentina and Uruguay).

In the first round, Brazil topped their group with Czechoslovakia finishing second, above Mexico and Spain. USSR and Yugoslavia finished above Uruguay and Colombia. Hungary, along with England progressed to the quarter-finals, while Argentina and Bulgaria were eliminated. England had the same number of points as Argentina but progressed due to a superior goal average; the first time such a requirement had been necessary in a World Cup finals tournament. Switzerland lost all three games while West Germany and Chile both went through over Italy.

Chile defeated European champions USSR to earn a semi-final game against the winner of the England – Brazil game. Garrincha scored two goals in a 3–1 win against England. Meanwhile, 1–0 wins for Yugoslavia against West Germany – and another 1–0 win of Czechoslovakia against neighbours Hungary – saw the two Slavic states meet in the semi-finals.

Viña del Mar was the original venue for the South American semi-final and Santiago for the Slavic one, but due to Chile's surprise qualification, the organisers prompted FIFA to switch the venues. This irritated crowds in Viña del Mar and only a little under 6,000 spectators came to Estadio Sausalito to watch Czechoslovakia beat Yugoslavia 3–1, whereas a capacity crowd of 76,600 in Santiago watched Brazil beat the hosts 4–2. This game saw Garrincha sent off for Brazil and Honorino Landa sent off for Chile. Chile eventually took third place in a 1–0 victory over Yugoslavia with the last play of the match. The same player, Eladio Rojas, had also scored the winning goal in Chile's game against USSR.

Santiago's Estadio Nacional served as the venue for the final, and after 15 minutes, Brazil again found themselves a goal behind in the World Cup final, as a long ball from Adolf Scherer was latched onto by Josef Masopust: 1–0 Czechoslovakia. As in the previous final in 1958, Brazil soon hit back, equalising two minutes later through Amarildo after an error by Czechoslovak goalkeeper Schroijf. The Brazilians scored goals from Zito and Vavá (another Schrojf error) midway through the second half, and the Czechoslovaks could not get back into the game. The match ended 3–1 to Brazil, a successful defence of the title for only the second time in the history of the competition in spite of the absence of one of their star players of 1958, Pelé, who was replaced by Amarildo.

Group stage

Group 1

Group 2

Group 3

Group 4

Knockout stage

Bracket

Quarter-finals

Semi-finals

Third place play-off

Final

Goalscorers

With four goals each, Flórián Albert, Garrincha, Valentin Ivanov, Dražan Jerković, Leonel Sánchez and Vavá were the top scorers in the tournament. In total, 89 goals were scored by 54 players, with none of them credited as own goal.

4 goals

 Garrincha
 Vavá
 Leonel Sánchez
 Flórián Albert
 Valentin Ivanov
 Dražan Jerković

3 goals

 Amarildo
 Adolf Scherer
 Lajos Tichy
 Milan Galić

2 goals

 Jaime Ramírez
 Eladio Rojas
 Jorge Toro
 Ron Flowers
 Giacomo Bulgarelli
 Igor Chislenko
 Viktor Ponedelnik
 José Sasía
 Uwe Seeler

1 goal

 Héctor Facundo
 José Sanfilippo
 Pelé
 Mário Zagallo
 Zito
 Georgi Sokolov
 Germán Aceros
 Marcos Coll
 Marino Klinger
 Antonio Rada
 Francisco Zuluaga
 Josef Kadraba
 Václav Mašek
 Josef Masopust
 Jozef Štibrányi
 Bobby Charlton
 Jimmy Greaves
 Gerry Hitchens
 Ernő Solymosi
 Bruno Mora
 Alfredo del Águila
 Isidoro Díaz
 Héctor Hernández
 Aleksei Mamykin
 Adelardo
 Joaquín Peiró
 Heinz Schneiter
 Rolf Wüthrich
 Ángel Cabrera
 Luis Cubilla
 Albert Brülls
 Horst Szymaniak
 Vojislav Melić
 Petar Radaković
 Josip Skoblar

FIFA retrospective ranking
In 1986, FIFA published a report that ranked all teams in each World Cup up to and including 1986, based on progress in the competition, overall results and quality of the opposition. The rankings for the 1962 tournament were as follows:

Footnotes

External links

1962 FIFA World Cup Chile , FIFA.com
Details at RSSSF

 
FIFA
FIFA World Cup tournaments
International association football competitions hosted by Chile
May 1962 sports events in South America
June 1962 sports events in South America